= Nasai railway station =

Railway station in Pakistan

Coordinates: 30.812648°N 68.045465°E

General information
- Owner: Ministry of Railways

Other information
- Station code: NSAI

History
- Former names: Great Indian Peninsula Railway
Location

Nasai railway station (Urdu: نسئ ریلوے اسٹیشن) is located in Pakistan.

== See also ==
- List of railway stations in Pakistan
- Pakistan Railways
